Vera Brühne (English: The Trials of Vera B.) is a 2001 two-part German TV film about Vera Brühne who was convicted of murder.

Cast

References

External links 

German-language television shows
2000s German-language films
2000s German television miniseries
2000s crime drama television series
2001 German television series debuts
2001 German television series endings
2001 television films
2001 films
2001 crime drama films
German crime drama films
German television films
Television series set in the 1950s
Television series set in the 1960s
Films set in the 1950s
Films set in the 1960s
Films set in West Germany
Television series based on actual events
Crime films based on actual events
Sat.1 original programming
2000s German films